Peter Gerenčer (born 28 April 1985) is a Slovenian football forward who plays for SV Mühlgraben.

External links
 Player profile at NZS 
 Player profile at ÖFB 

1985 births
Living people
Slovenian footballers
Association football forwards
Slovenian PrvaLiga players
NK Nafta Lendava players
Slovenian expatriate sportspeople in Austria
Expatriate footballers in Austria
Slovenian expatriate footballers